L'autre... is the third studio album by Mylène Farmer, released on 9 April 1991. It contains the singer's biggest hit, "Désenchantée", which was number-one in France for nine weeks, and other three top ten hits. The album was generally well received by the critics and was a great success in terms of chart and sales (#1 for twenty weeks), becoming the best-selling album throughout the singer's career and the twenty second best-selling album of all time in France.

Background 
After her first concert tour in 1989, Mylène Farmer released the new song "À quoi je sers..." which was a synthesis of her musical work and marked the end of an age. While the album En concert was charted, she took advantage of the following months to travel in various countries including India, and to discover new literary works, such as those of Emil Cioran in which she drew inspiration. She also became interested in painting and visited many art galleries and museums that were also sources of inspiration for her. Then she decided to compose a third studio album which was recorded at the studios Mega. This one showed an evolution of the singer : indeed, the texts marked a change of mindset and testified to a transformation in her life including a greater openness to the other (hence the album's title). From that moment, the singer decided to more express herself and went to the meeting of her fellow man. Writing for five months, this album was the result of all what has happened to Farmer "at personal and artistic levels".

For this new album, Farmer changed her hairstyle because she wanted a different look without changing : she opted for a very short hair cut, made by Jean-Marc Maniatis. The album cover, much more luminous than that of Ainsi soit je..., shows Farmer lying on a white background with a crow on her shoulder (this cover was undoubtedly inspired by the Edgar Allan Poe's poem The Raven). The singer explained that the crow on the cover was not for her a sign of doom, but had rather a role of a protective ally. The album was eventually released in April 1991, one month after the marketing of the single "Désenchantée" which was #1 on the French Singles Charts. It was released in Europe, in francophone countries and Japan.

The album had the particularity to contain the first duet of Farmer, "Regrets", recorded with Jean-Louis Murat (in 1987, Farmer had already sung "Frantz" in a show with Guy Béart, but this duet hadn't appeared on an album). Laurent Boutonnat decided to record the songs of the album in English-language, but they were ultimately not used. He also wanted to release as singles all the songs from the album, but that didn't happen because of a lack of money.

Lyrics and music 
Farmer explained the album's content in an interview: "What changed is that I don't want no more to feel pity for myself and to settle old scores. (...) I am much more shameless in this album than in the previous one. (...) Speak about what I feel in my heart and in my soul, it is a way of revealing myself." However, this album re-uses the old themes dear to the singer: indeed, death, religion, social revolt, despair, sexuality and madness are tackled in the various songs.

Critical reception 

On the whole, L'autre... received generally positive reviews from media and critics. France Soir said this album is "a techno pop very well produced". Midi Libre stated : "This album will bring fair satisfactions to many people. The general atmosphere seems much less crooked than usual". The musicians are "excellent" and the songs are "good". Télé Loisirs saw in this album "a more assertive maturity, a less shaken personality". L'autre... was even elected best album of 1991 by the readers of Smash hits.

This album earned Farmer a reward at the World Music Awards as the best-selling French album.

Commercial performance 
In France, the album went straight to number one on the French Album Chart on 8 April 1991 and stayed there for twenty consecutive weeks. As a result, at the time, Farmer topped both the Album and Singles Charts (with "Désenchantée"). The next sixteen weeks, the album dropped to #26, but reached again #3, three weeks later, thanks to the release of "Je t'aime mélancolie". The album appeared for a total of 55 weeks on the chart (Top 40), 32 of them in the top five. The album was certified Diamond disc by the SNEP for a minimum of one million copies sold. To date, L'autre... is the best-selling album of Farmer.

In other countries, the album's sales were more confidential. In Switzerland, the album appeared for nine weeks on the chart, from 26 May to 8 September 1991, peaking at #27 on 25 August. In Sweden, it was #45 on 31 July 1991 and was ranked #55 in Germany.

Track listing 

Note
1 Duet with Jean-Louis Murat

Personnel 

 Text: Mylène Farmer
 Music: Laurent Boutonnat
 Keyboard and arrangement: Laurent Boutonnat
 Piano on "Désenchantée": Bruno Fontaine
 Guitars: Slim Pezin
 Acoustic basses: Bernard Paganotti
 Military step on "Il n'y a pas d'ailleurs": Philippe Draï
 Flute and harp: Pol Ramirez Del Piu
 Rhythmic programmings: Thierry Rogen, Laurent Boutonnat
 Programmer: Patrice Rouillon Tsernsoff de Gironville
 Vocals: Mylène Farmer

 Sound engineer: Thierry Rogen
 Assistant: Lionel Philippe
 Editions: Requiem Publishing, Paul van Parys
 Management: Thierry Suc
 Cover design: Com'N.B
 Photos: Marianne Rosenstiehl (Sygma)
 Mastering and engraving: André Perriat (Top Master)
 Recorded and mixed at Studio Mega
 Production: Toutankhamon, Laurent Boutonnat, Thierry Rogen

Except for "Désenchantée": Carole Fredericks, Beckie Bell, Debbie Davis, with the participation of Sophie, Dominique, Edwige, Mandy and Cécile

Charts

Weekly charts

Year-end charts

Certifications and sales

Formats 
 12"
 CD
 Cassette
 Collector edition - Format : 12" - Limited and numbered edition (5,000)1
 CD - Japan
 CD - Taïwan
 CD - Digipack (since 2005)

1 Contains the CD album L'autre..., the CD maxi for "Désenchantée", a watch illustrated by "Désenchantée", three photos and an excerpt from the music video for "Désenchantée".

References 

1991 albums
Mylène Farmer albums
Polydor Records albums